Henry Charles Usborne (16 January 1909 – 16 March 1996) was a British Labour Party politician who defected to the Liberal Party.

He was born in Leamington Spa, Warwickshire, was educated at Bradfield College and read Engineering at Corpus Christi College, Cambridge.

At the 1945 general election, he was elected as the Member of Parliament (MP) for Acocks Green. The constituency was then abolished and in 1950 Usborne was elected in the marginal constituency of Birmingham Yardley. He held the seat until the 1959 general election.

According to his obituary in the Times on 19 March 1996, Usborne resigned from the Labour Party in 1962 and joined the Liberal Party. He urged former colleagues to join Jo Grimond's party as the best hope for defeating the Conservatives. There was a suggestion that Usborne be nominated to stand for the Liberal Party at Cheltenham, but he announced that wild horses would not drag him into another parliamentary contest.

In addition to his work as a constituency MP, he was one of the main drivers in the British branch of the World Federalist Movement. In 1947, ahead of the foundation of the United Nations, he cofounded the Parliamentary Group for World Government, which as All Party Parliamentary Group for World Governance (APPGWG) counts today (2008) 167 members and meets regularly to provide a forum for debate on global governance issues in the British Parliament. In 1951, Usborne set up the One World Trust as an independent educational Charity to provide secretarial support to the Group, promote and disseminate knowledge on world governance. In addition to its ongoing support for the APPGWG, the One World Trust conducts independent research into the accountability of global organisations, political engagement of citizens at global level and international law.

He died in Evesham, Worcestershire, at 86.

References

Times Guide to the House of Commons

External links

Footnotes

1909 births
1996 deaths
Labour Party (UK) MPs for English constituencies
People educated at Summer Fields School
Alumni of Corpus Christi College, Cambridge
UK MPs 1945–1950
UK MPs 1950–1951
UK MPs 1951–1955
UK MPs 1955–1959
Liberal Party (UK) politicians